Venkatesha "Venky" Jois (born 7 July 1993) is an Australian professional basketball player for the Helios Suns of the Slovenian League. He played four years of college basketball for Eastern Washington before playing professionally in Estonia, Croatia, Japan, Serbia and Germany.

Early life
Jois was born in the Melbourne suburb of Upper Ferntree Gully to an Indian father and an Australian mother. He attended Box Hill High School, where he participated in basketball, swimming, soccer, Australian rules football, cross country and athletics. He graduated in 2011. In 2011 and 2012, he played in the SEABL for the Dandenong Rangers, winning SEABL Youth Player of the Year honours in his first season after averaging 9.3 points, 5.9 rebounds and 1.6 assists per game.

College career
Jois played four years of college basketball for Eastern Washington, winning Big Sky Freshman of the Year honours in 2012–13. He also garnered All-Big Sky honorable mention accolades in his first two seasons. As a junior and senior, he earned first-team All-Big Sky honours. He also earned All-Tournament team honours after helping Eastern Washington win the 2015 Big Sky tournament. In said season, Jois led the Eagles in both rebounds and blocks, and was second on the team in scoring. As a result of them winning the Big Sky tournament, they were selected as a participant in the 2015 NCAA tournament. EWU was seeded as a #13 seed where they faced off against the #4 seeded Georgetown Hoyas in the first round, within the South Regional. Jois and the Eagles put up a valiant effort, but ultimately fell to Hoyas in a 10–point ballgame, 74–84, with Jois leading the team in rebounds and coming second in points. 

In 122 career games, Jois made 120 starts and averaged 14.8 points, 8.3 rebounds, 2.3 assists, 1.0 steals and 2.0 blocks in 32.2 minutes per game.

Professional career
Jois spent his first professional season in Estonia, playing for Tartu Ülikooli during the 2016–17 season. He then split the 2017–18 season between Vrijednosnice Osijek in Croatia and Shiga Lakestars in Japan. After starting the 2018–19 season in Germany with Rasta Vechta, he left in November 2018. On 26 January 2019, he signed with Melbourne United for the rest of the 2018–19 NBL season.

On 3 April 2019, Jois signed with the Super City Rangers for the 2019 New Zealand NBL season. On 2 June 2019, he suffered a severe hand injury in a game against the Southern Huskies. On 29 June 2019, he parted ways with the Rangers.

In October 2019, Jois joined the Memphis Hustle of the NBA G League. He missed two months with an undisclosed injury. Jois averaged 5.9 points and 3.9 rebounds in 12.3 minutes per game in 18 games.

In February 2021, Jois joined Pirot of the Basketball League of Serbia. In seven games, he averaged 10.0 points, 5.6 rebounds, 1.7 assists and 1.3 steals per game.

On 20 April 2021, Jois signed with the Cairns Taipans for the remainder of the 2020–21 NBL season. Following the NBL season, he joined the Dandenong Rangers of the NBL1 South.

In September 2021, Jois signed with the Helios Suns of Slovenian League.

References

External links
Shiga Lakestars player profile
Eastern Washington Eagles bio

1993 births
Living people
Australian expatriate basketball people in Croatia
Australian expatriate basketball people in Estonia
Australian expatriate basketball people in Germany
Australian expatriate basketball people in Japan
Australian expatriate basketball people in Serbia
Australian expatriate basketball people in New Zealand
Australian expatriate basketball people in the United States
Australian men's basketball players
Australian sportspeople of Indian descent
Basketball League of Serbia players
Cairns Taipans players
Eastern Washington Eagles men's basketball players
KK Pirot players
Korvpalli Meistriliiga players
Melbourne United players
Memphis Hustle players
Power forwards (basketball)
SC Rasta Vechta players
Shiga Lakes players
Super City Rangers players
University of Tartu basketball team players
Helios Suns players
People from Ferntree Gully, Victoria
Basketball players from Melbourne
Sportsmen from Victoria (Australia)